Owen Kelly (born 12 March 1977) is an Australian professional racing driver. Son of Chas Kelly, he has competed over the course of his career in V8 Supercars and NASCAR among other series.

Racing career

Kelly started his circuit racing career in Formula Ford for three seasons, progressing to V8 Supercars in 2000. From there he has raced in Super Touring, V8 Supercars and NASCAR Late models. Late in the 2007 V8 Supercar season he was picked up as a full-time driver for Paul Morris Motorsport replacing Fabian Coulthard.

In 2008 Kelly raced an asphalt late model, for Dale Earnhardt Jr., at Motormile Speedway in Radford, VA. He wanted to pursue a career in NASCAR and hoped to move up the ladder to get the necessary experience (Kelly started at the weekly track championship level). In June 2010, Kelly made his NASCAR debut in the Nationwide Series, driving for Baker Curb Racing at the Road America road course. He started ninth and finished fifth. K1 Speed sponsored the car. For 2011, Owen Kelly made no official start in the series but relief drove for Marcos Ambrose at Montreal who was in Michigan for the Sprint Cup Series race. He practiced and qualified the car while Kelly turned the wheel to Ambrose for the race. It turned up that Ambrose actually won the race in that car. In 2012 he practiced and qualified a car again, this time for Kyle Busch who ran his first race at Montreal since 2009. Busch finished tenth in the race after starting from the back of the field due to the driver change. It ended up that Kelly did not end up making any other attempts in 2012 and Ambrose did not run the Montreal race that year.

After a strong performance for Kyle Busch Motorsports at Road America in the Nationwide Series in 2013, it was announced that Kelly would make his debut in the NASCAR Sprint Cup Series, driving the No. 51 for Phoenix Racing, at Watkins Glen International in August of that year. Kelly finished 24th.

Kelly is of no relation to Todd or Rick Kelly, the latter he co-drove with at the 2010 and 2011 Bathurst 1000s.

Motorsports career results

V8 Supercar results

Complete Rolex Sports Car Series results
(key) (Races in bold indicate pole position, Results are overall/class)

NASCAR
(key) (Bold – Pole position awarded by qualifying time. Italics – Pole position earned by points standings or practice time. * – Most laps led.)

Sprint Cup Series

Xfinity Series

 Season still in progress
 Ineligible for series points

Complete Bathurst 1000 results

* Events highlighted in green denote designated co-driver role

‡Kelly practiced but did not start due to illness.

References

External links

 
 Owen Kelly at Driver Database

1977 births
24 Hours of Daytona drivers
Formula Ford drivers
Living people
NASCAR drivers
Racing drivers from Tasmania
Supercars Championship drivers
V8SuperTourer drivers
Joe Gibbs Racing drivers
Kelly Racing drivers
Dick Johnson Racing drivers
Garry Rogers Motorsport drivers